The State-owned Assets Supervision and Administration Commission of the State Council (SASAC) is a special commission of the People's Republic of China, directly under the State Council. It was founded in 2003 through the consolidation of various other industry-specific ministries. SASAC is responsible for managing state-owned enterprises (SOEs), including appointing top executives and approving any mergers or sales of stock or assets, as well as drafting laws related to SOEs.

, its companies had a combined assets of CN¥194 trillion (US$30 trillion), revenue of more than CN¥30 trillion (US$4.6 trillion), and an estimated stock value of CN¥65 trillion (US$10.06 trillion), making it the one of the largest economic entities in the world.

Central SOEs 

, SASAC currently oversees 97 centrally owned companies. Companies directly supervised by SASAC are continuously reduced through mergers according to the state-owned enterprise restructuring plan with the number of SASAC companies down from over 150 in 2008.

Institutions affiliated to SASAC 
 Information Center
 Technological Research Center for Supervisory Panels Work
 Training Center
 Economic Research Center
 China Economics Publishing House
 China Business Executives Academy, Dalian

Industrial associations 
Affiliated industrial associations include:
 China Federation of Industrial Economics 
 China Enterprise Confederation 
 China Association for Quality 
 China Packaging Technology Association 
 China International Cooperation Association for SMEs 
 China General Chamber of Commerce 
 China Federation of Logistics and Purchasing 
 China Coal Industry Association 
 China Machinery Industry Federation 
 China Iron and Steel Association 
 China Petroleum and Chemical Industry Association 
 China National Light Industry Associations 
 China National Textile Industry Council 
 China Building Materials Industry Association 
 China Nonferrous Metals Industry Association

See also 
 China Beijing Equity Exchange
 China Milan Equity Exchange
 List of government-owned companies of China
 Rostec
 State-owned Enterprises Commission, the equivalent in Taiwan (ROC)

References

External links 

 

State Council of the People's Republic of China
 
2003 establishments in China